Ctenoides is a genus of bivalves belonging to the family Limidae.

The genus has almost cosmopolitan distribution.

Species

Species:

Ctenoides ales 
Ctenoides annulatus 
Ctenoides catherinae

References

Limidae
Bivalve genera